Sabaya (formerly: Atahuallpa) is a province in the central parts of the Bolivian Oruro Department. Its seat is Sabaya.

Location
Sabaya Province is one of sixteen provinces in the Oruro Department. It is located between 18° 35' and 19° 39' South and between 67° 31' and 68° 39' West.

It borders Sajama Province in the north, the Republic of Chile and Puerto de Mejillones Province in the west, the Potosí Department in the southwest, the Ladislao Cabrera Province in the southeast, and the Litoral Province in the northeast.

The province extends over 160 km from northwest to southeast, and 50 km from northeast to southwest.

Geography 
One of the highest peaks of the province is Pukintika on the border to Chile. Other mountains are listed below:

Climate

Population
The main language in the province is Spanish, spoken by 92%, 67% of the population speak Aymara and 9% speak Quechua. The population increased from 3,567 inhabitants (1992 census) to 7,114 (2001 census), an increase of almost 100%. 40.7% of the population is younger than 15 years old.

66.4% of the population are employed in agriculture, 1.6% in mining, 4.9% in industry, 27.1% in general services (2001).

59% of the population are Catholics, 32% are Protestants (1992).

Division
The province comprises three municipalities which are further subdivided into cantons.

See also 
 Chipaya

References

External links
Population data (Spanish)

Provinces of Oruro Department